The 337th Volksgrenadier Division was a German military unit formed during World War II.

References

Volks
Military units and formations disestablished in 1945
Volksgrenadier divisions